Isabelle Abiera Collins-Magno (born August 28, 1992), professionally known as Max Collins, is a Filipino-American actress and model.

Early life
Collins was born in California. Her mother is a Filipino who is from Kalibo, Aklan. Her father is an American of Irish-Italian descent. Her parents met in Los Angeles when her mother was working at Bloomingdale's. Her parents separated when she was four years old.  Her mother remarried when she was 9. She has a younger half-brother.

Collins used to live in Vallejo, California. When she was 10, her family moved to Kalibo, Aklan.
For four years she lived in Boracay and attended Brent School Boracay.

Career

2006–2010: Early years in ABS–CBN
Collins started doing commercials when she was 10. She has also appeared in magazines like Meg, Candy, Mega, People and Seventeen. According to her, she was discovered by a talent scout when she accidentally walked into a shop while a shoot was ongoing. After a year she was brought to ABS-CBN, Tried out a VTR with Star Magic, and Got a call back after a month. Eventually she qualified for Star Magic Batch 15.

Collins was just 13 when she was launched as a Star Magic Batch 15 member. Under her stage name Isabelle Abiera, she did small roles in ABS-CBN's Star Magic Presents: Astigs and Star Magic Presents: Abt Ur Luv Ur Lyf 2 She also had a short hosting stint in Channel V. However, her entertainment career was put on a hold when she left for the United States.

Collins made a comeback into the Philippine entertainment industry as one of the regular hosts of the defunct noontime program Wowowee, at the same time she appeared as Veronica in the afternoon TV series Rosalka. She played a planted gate crasher in Pinoy Big Brother: Teen Clash 2010. When Rosalka ended, she went on to play Christy in Precious Hearts Romances Presents: Alyna.

2011–present: Transfer to GMA Network
In 2010, when her contract with Star Magic ended, Collins left for the United States to figure things out. A year after, she returned to the Philippines to relaunch her entertainment career. She changed her agent to Perry Lansigan's PPL Entertainment, Inc., changed her stage name to Max Collins, and finally signed an exclusive contract with GMA Network.

In 2012, she starred as a supporting role in her first afternoon series project under GMA Network, The Good Daughter and plays as Bea's (Kylie Padilla) best friend and a secret lover of Darwin. She also appeared in some episodes of Maynila. She also starred in Primetime TV series Pahiram ng Sandali with Dingdong Dantes, alongside Lorna Tolentino and Boyet de Leon.

In March 2015, Collins appeared as a cover girl for FHM Philippines 15th Anniversary issue, which co-headline with Online babes Tricia Santos and PBA courtside reporter Rizza Diaz. Collins was included on the top 10 of the 2015 FHM 100 Sexiest Woman, Collins was on the ninth spot.

Personal life
Collins is a cousin of actresses Lauren Young and Megan Young. She is close friends with actress Jessy Mendiola. Collins was baptized as a Born-again Christian in October 2015. In May 2017, Collins announced, through Instagram, her engagement to fiancé Pancho Magno. They were married in a Christian ceremony at the Manila Marriot Hotel on December 11, 2017. They have a son, Skye Anakin, who was born on July 6, 2020. He was named after the characters of the Star Wars franchise.

Filmography

Television

Film

References

External links
 

1992 births
Actresses from California
Filipino child actresses
Filipino female models
Filipino television actresses
Filipino people of American descent
Filipino people of Irish descent
Filipino people of Italian descent
American actresses of Filipino descent
Living people
People from Aklan
Star Magic
Filipino Christians
Filipino evangelicals